The Horcones Massacre (Masacre Los Horcones) was a series of killings centered on the Los Horcones ranch in the department of Olancho, Honduras, in June 1975, in which up to 14 religious leaders, campesinos, and students were killed by the Honduran military. 

Major Jose Enrique Chinchilla, Lieutenant Benjamin Plata, Manuel Zelaya and Carlos Bahr were convicted for involvement the massacre. Manuel Zelaya is the father of Manuel Zelaya, later president of Honduras.

Events

Among those killed were Father Iván Betancourt, a visiting Colombian priest working in areas where agrarian reform cooperatives were organizing, and Father Michael Jerome Cypher (Padre Casimiro), a priest visiting from Wisconsin, United States who was tortured to death during an interrogation.

Five farmers were burned alive in a bread oven. The bodies of two priests were castrated and severely mutilated. Two women were thrown into a well alive before the shaft was dynamited.

According to journalist and author Wendy Griffin, "The Massacre of Los Horcones was seen as a clash between the interests of large landowners and the social activism of the church of the time."  After the bodies were found, the federal government ordered all priests, monks, and nuns to leave the area for their own safety.

One of the victims was Máximo Aguilera, the father of Christian Democratic Party congressman Lucas Aguilera.

Convictions

José Manuel "Mel" Zelaya, a rich landowner and father of later President of the Republic José Manuel "Mel" Zelaya, allegedly gave a $2,500 reward for killing the Colombian priest.
 
The provincial army commander Major Jose Enrique Chinchilla, Lieutenant Benjamin Silver, Manuel "Mel" Zelaya and Carlos Bahr were sentenced to 20 years in prison. Zelaya Jr. visited his incarcerated father often, sometimes sleeping on the prison floor, according to Victor Meza, Zelaya's former interior minister.

The murderers were favored by the amnesty decree, on military crimes, of the Constituent National Assembly on September 3, 1980. They had spent a little over a year in prison when released on September 11.

Today
According to the Guardian newspaper, everyone in the town remembers the slayings.

References

External links
Revistazo human rights magazine: Mártires de “Los Horcones”
Wendy Griffin - Honduras This Week - Popular organizations remember Los Horcones 25 years later
"Rebels with a Cause" assassinated in the Americas
Recuerdan masacre de Los Horcones con misa
El Mundo: Como un mártir con pistolas (English translation)

Mass murder in 1975
1975 in Honduras
Massacres in 1975
June 1975 events in North America
Massacres in Honduras
Liberation theology
History of Honduras
1970s murders in Honduras
1975 murders in North America